Shroyer is a surname of German origin which is the Pennsylvania German form of the original German Schreyer or Schreier and more seldom Schraier or Schrayer. Notable people with the surname include:

Don Shroyer (born ca. 1926), American college football player and coach
Ken Shroyer (1898–1974), American football coach
Owen Shroyer (born 1989), American political activist and commentator
Sonny Shroyer (born 1935), American actor

See also 

 Schreyer 
 Scheier
 Shrayer

German-language surnames